James Charles Lewis, III (born October 31, 1990), known professionally as Lil' JJ and Big JJ, is an American actor and stand-up comedian, best known for his role as Jordan on the Nickelodeon television series Just Jordan and doing Vital Information sketch for All That in season ten.

Life and career
Lil' JJ was born in Little Rock Arkansas. He won BET's comedy talent search Comin' to the Stage.

He became a cast member on Nickelodeon's All That in its 10th season. He guest starred on Nickelodeon's Ned's Declassified School Survival Guide, made a cameo appearance in Chris Brown's music video "Yo (Excuse Me Miss)", in Sean Kingston's music video "Beautiful Girls," Nelly's music video "Stepped On My J'z, Hot Styles' video "Lookin Boy" and Young Gunz' video "Friday Night" . He also appeared with a rap verse on Small Change's music video for "Don't Be Shy".

He also played a supporting role in the film Crossover (2006) as a character named "Up."

In 2005 and 2006, he appeared in the Nickelodeon series Romeo! as Romeo's best friend, Jason Brooks, in seasons 2 and 3.

In 2007, he starred in the Nickelodeon series Just Jordan as Jordan Lewis. In 2008, he, Lily Collins, and Pick Boy appeared together on Nickelodeon for special events. Also, Lil' JJ has appeared in the ABC television series The Secret Life of the American Teenager.

In 2008, he hosted the variety/sketch DVD Almost Grown.

He appeared on the TNT show Men of a Certain Age as DaShaun and on an episode of Chelsea Lately.

He also appeared on the TV One sitcom The Rickey Smiley Show as Brandon.

As of April 18, 2013, Lewis is a member of Omega Psi Phi at Arkansas Baptist College.

He returned to television and became a regular cast member of Wild 'n Out since Season 12 on MTV and VH1.

Filmography

Film

Television

Music Videos

Discography
 2009: Yo Yo

Singles
 2012: "Party Boi"

References

External links
 
 Lil' JJ on Myspace

1990 births
Living people
21st-century American male actors
Male actors from Little Rock, Arkansas
American male child actors
African-American male comedians
American male film actors
African-American male actors
African-American television personalities
American male comedians
American stand-up comedians
Musicians from Little Rock, Arkansas
American male television actors
21st-century American comedians
Arkansas Baptist College alumni